Voddie T. Baucham, Jr. (born March 11, 1969) is an  American pastor, author, and educator. He serves as Dean of Theology at African Christian University in Lusaka, Zambia.

Education and career 
Born in Los Angeles, Baucham studied at New Mexico State University and Rice University, playing football as a tight end. He then transferred to Houston Baptist University, where he graduated with a B.A. He went on to obtain an M.Div. from Southwestern Baptist Theological Seminary and a D.Min. from Southeastern Baptist Theological Seminary. Baucham also did additional post-graduate study at the University of Oxford. He founded Voddie Baucham Ministries in 1993.

Baucham served as pastor of Grace Family Baptist Church in Spring, Texas (a congregation within the Southern Baptist Convention) until he moved to Zambia in 2015. He is a board member of Founders Ministries.

In March 2022, Baucham confirmed that he had been asked to accept a nomination for president of the Southern Baptist Convention, but noted that as an overseas missionary, he was not sure if he was eligible.

Beliefs

Theology 
Baucham is Reformed in his theology, and subscribes to the 1689 Baptist Confession of Faith. He calls himself a "fire-breathing, TULIP believing, five-point Calvinist." Baucham appeared in the 2019 Netflix documentary American Gospel: Christ Crucified speaking in favor of penal substitutionary atonement. His statement "God killed Jesus" was criticized for "muddying the waters" on this doctrine.

Biblical patriarchy 
Baucham is an adherent of biblical patriarchy. He outlined his views on the subject in his 2009 book What He Must Be: ...If He Wants to Marry My Daughter, though preferring the phrase "gospel patriarchy". Baucham criticized Sarah Palin's vice presidential candidacy in 2008, on the basis that women serve best at home.

Baucham is also a supporter of the Stay-at-home daughter movement. He appeared in Vision Forum's 2007 documentary Return of the Daughters, in which he said that America is suffering an "epidemic of unprotected women."

Family and church 
Baucham and his wife have homeschooled their children, and he has spoken against Christians sending their children to public schools. In his 2007 book, Family Driven Faith: Doing What It Takes to Raise Sons and Daughters Who Walk with God, Baucham argued that parents (especially fathers) can and should disciple their children through family worship and through attending family integrated churches.

Critical race theory 
Baucham rejects critical race theory in favor of what he calls "biblical justice", and sees it as a religious movement, with its own cosmology, saints, liturgy, and law. Baucham's 2021 book Fault Lines: The Social Justice Movement and Evangelicalism's Looming Catastrophe outlines his criticisms of the movement. In Fault Lines he argues that Critical Theory and its subsets, Critical Race Theory-Intersectionality and Critical Social Justice are grounded in Western Marxism, the public social justice conversation is perpetuating misinformation, and is incompatible with Christianity as a competing worldview. In August 2021, Baucham was accused of plagiarizing parts of the book and falsifying a quote he attributed to Richard Delgado, an early researcher of critical race theory. The publisher, Salem Books, rejected the plagiarism claim, saying it was merely a matter of style, while Delgado denied making such a quotation.

Personal life 
Baucham is African-American. He became a Christian in 1987. He and his wife Bridget have nine children. He is a practitioner of Brazilian jiu-jitsu.

In February 2021, Baucham experienced heart failure and had to travel to the Mayo Clinic Florida for treatment. A GoFundMe campaign for his medical expenses raised more than a million dollars.

Books 
 The Ever-Loving Truth: Can Faith Thrive in a Post-Christian Culture? (Broadman & Holman, 2004)
 Family Driven Faith: Doing What It Takes to Raise Sons and Daughters Who Walk with God (Crossway, 2007)
 What He Must Be: ...If He Wants to Marry My Daughter (Crossway, 2009)
 Family Shepherds: Calling and Equipping Men to Lead Their Homes (Crossway, 2011)
 Joseph And the Gospel of Many Colors: Reading an Old Story in a New Way (Crossway, 2013)
 Expository Apologetics: Answering Objections with the Power of the Word (Crossway, 2015)
 Fault Lines: The Social Justice Movement and Evangelicalism's Looming Catastrophe (Salem Books, 2021)

External links

References 

Living people
Southern Baptist ministers
New Mexico State Aggies football players
Rice Owls football players
Houston Christian University alumni
Southwestern Baptist Theological Seminary alumni
Converts to Christianity
African-American Christian clergy
Writers from Los Angeles
1969 births
21st-century African-American people
20th-century African-American people